The University of Chlef, is a university in Algeria in the province of Chlef. It was established in 2001 by grouping several national institutes of higher education into one center, and named after the Algerian martyr Hassiba Benbouali. The university currently has almost 26,000 students enrolled over nine faculties, with 75 specialties in the first cycle (LMD) and nearly 112 specialties at the masters level. The teaching staff consists of 1,083 teachers and the personal staff consists of 1,195 functionaries.

History

Foundation 
The university began during the academic year 1983/1984 with the foundation of the national institute of higher education in civil engineering which enrolled 144 registered students. During the academic year 1986/1987 two new national institutes of higher education - hydraulics and agronomy - were officially opened. Since 1988 other formation courses have been opened, including:
mechanical engineering
electronics
business informatics
accounting and taxation

In 1992 the INES of Chlef were grouped under the governance of a single directorate by the creation of the university center of Chlef, an opportunity that has opened up others sectors such as:

Economic science
Management science
Legal and administrative science
Arabic literature
Process engineering
Data processing
Science of nature and life
Biology

In 2001 the university center became a university that consisted of three faculties: 
Faculty of Science and Engineering Science
Faculty of Earth Sciences and Agricultural Science
Faculty of Human Sciences and Social Science

In 2006 Chlef was restructured with five facilities and one institute:

Faculty of Science and Engineering Science
Faculties of Agricultural Sciences and Biological Sciences
Faculty of Economic Science and Management Science
Faculty of Legal and Administrative Science
Faculty of Letters and Languages
Institute of Physical Education and Sports

In the academic year 2007/2008 the university began to offer degrees in two new academic fields:
Law and political science
Human science

In 2008/2009 the university began to offer masters-level degrees in several specialties:
Science and technology
Process engineering
Science of nature and life
Reproductive biology
Water and environment
Human nutrition
Food science

The university's masters training has benefited from various options in the following areas:

Science and technology.
Science of nature and life.
Economic science, management and commercial science.
Science and technology of physical and sports activities.

It should also be pointed out that the academic year 2010/2011 saw the generalization of the LMD system at the level of all faculties as well as the restructuring of the university into seven faculties and two institutes:

Faculty of technology.
Faculty of science.
Faculty of letters and languages.
Faculty of human and social science.
Faculty of Civil Engineering and Architecture.
Faculty of economic science, commercial and management science.
Faculty of law and politic science.
Institute of agronomic science.
Institute of physical education and sports.

UHBC also saw the creation of the 4th Vice-Rectorate in charge of postgraduate studies, university habilitation, scientific research and post-graduation higher education, which gave it the rank of (A). With the start of the 2016/2017 academic year UHBC brought together nine faculties and under one institute:
Faculty of Technology.
Faculty of Exact Sciences and Computer Science
Faculty of Arts and Arts
Faculty of Foreign Languages.
Faculty of Humanities and Social Sciences.
Faculty of Civil Engineering and Architecture.
Faculty of Economics, Business and Management Sciences.
Faculty of Rights and Political Sciences.
Faculty of Science of Nature and Life.
Institute of Physical Education and Sports.

See also 
 List of universities in Algeria

References

External links
 Official website

2001 establishments in Algeria
Chlef
Buildings and structures in Chlef Province